Frantic is a VIC-20 space shoot 'em up published by Imagine Software on cassette in 1982. A ZX Spectrum 48K version was planned, but never released.

Gameplay
The player pilots a space ship while trying to keep an X and Y axis centered on the enemy, which enters the field of play at varying speeds and directions. Slower enemies appear horizontally and quicker enemies diagonally. The game's title alludes to the fact that the game is timed, as fuel levels deplete during play. Centering the X and Y axis to target enemies involves engaging thrusters which in turn burns fuel. The game can be played with either a joystick or keyboard.

References

1982 video games
VIC-20 games
VIC-20-only games
Shoot 'em ups
Video games developed in the United Kingdom